Laudakia is a genus of lizards, commonly known as Asian rock agamas, in the family Agamidae. The genus is found mostly in Asia, with some species in Southern Europe.

Taxonomy
Some species of Laudakia, sensu lato, are now recognized in the new genera Paralaudakia found in Eurasia. For African agamas see the genera Agama and Acanthocercus.

Species and subspecies
Listed alphabetically.
Laudakia agrorensis  – Agror agama
Laudakia cypriaca  – Cyprus rock agama
Laudakia dayana  – Haridwar agama
Laudakia melanura  – black agama
Laudakia nupta  – large-scaled (rock) agama 
Laudakia nupta nupta 
Laudakia nupta fusca 
Laudakia nuristanica  – Leviton's rock agama
Laudakia pakistanica  – Pakistani agama
Laudakia pakistanica pakistanica 
Laudakia pakistanica auffenbergi 
Laudakia pakistanica khani 
Laudakia papenfussi  – Papenfuss's rock agama
Laudakia sacra  – Anan's rock agama
Laudakia stellio  – starred agama, roughtail rock agama
Laudakia stellio daani 
Laudakia stellio stellio 
Laudakia tuberculata  – tuberculated agama, Kashmir rock agama
Laudakia vulgaris  – Egyptian rock agama
Laudakia vulgaris vulgaris 
Laudakia vulgaris brachydactyla 
Laudakia vulgaris picea 
Laudakia wui  – Wui's rock agama

Moved to genus Acanthocercus
Acanthocercus adramitanus  – Anderson's rock agama
Acanthocercus atricollis  – black-necked tree agama

Moved to genus Paralaudakia
Paralaudakia badakhshana  – Badakhshana rock agama
Paralaudakia bochariensis 
Paralaudakia caucasia  – Caucasian agama
Paralaudakia erythrogastra  – redbelly rock agama
Paralaudakia himalayana  – Himalayan agama
Paralaudakia lehmanni  – Turkestan agama
Paralaudakia microlepis  – small-scaled agama
Paralaudakia stoliczkana  – Mongolian rock agama

Nota bene: A binomial authority or trinomial authority in parentheses indicates that the species or subspecies was originally described in a different genus.

References

Further reading
Baig KJ, Wagner P, Ananjeva NB, Böhme W (2012). "A morphology-based taxonomic revision of Laudakia Gray, 1845 (Squamata: Agamidae)". Vertebrate Zoology 62 (2): 213-260. (Paralaudakia and Stellagama, new genera).
Gray JE (1845). Catalogue of the Specimens of Lizards in the Collection of the British Museum. London: Trustees of the British Museum. (Edward Newman, printer). xxviii + 289 pp. (Laudakia, new genus, p. 254).
Sindaco R, Jeremčenko VK (2008). The Reptiles of the Western Palearctic. 1. Annotated Checklist and Distributional Atlas of the Turtles, Crocodiles, Amphisbaenians and Lizards of Europe, North Africa, Middle East and Central Asia. (Monographs of the Societas Herpetologica Italica). Latina, Italy: Edizioni Belvedere. 580 pp. .

 
Lizard genera
Taxa named by John Edward Gray